Sahil (also transliterated as)  is the capital and the most populous city in the governorate of Bareq. It is the capital of ″Isba'i″ tribe. Khamis as Sahil  was one of the greatest Tihama  (held on Thursday) of the neighbourhood.

Climate 

See also 

Bareq
Bariq tribe 
Bareqi Arabic

References 

Populated places in Bareq
Populated places in 'Asir Province
Populated coastal places in Saudi Arabia